Kurowski (feminine: Kurowska; plural: Kurowscy) is a Polish surname. It comes from place names such as Kurowo and Kurów, which are derived from a Polish word for hen. Noble families bearing the name used various coats of arms, including Kur, Kurowski, Lubicz, Prawdzic, Strzemie, Ślepowron, Srzeniawa, and Topór. There are over 16,000 people with the surname in Poland.

People 
 Bożena Kurowska (1937-1969), Polish actress
 Bruno Kurowski (1879-1944), German politician
 Eva Kurowski (born 1965), German jazz musician
 Franz Kurowski (1923-2011), German author
 Klemens Kurowski (1340-1405), Polish nobleman
 Maciej Kurowski (born 1986), Polish luger
 Marian Kurowski, Polish football manager
 Mikołaj Kurowski (died 1411), Polish nobleman
 Sebastian Kurowski (born 1988), Polish footballer
 Whitey Kurowski (1918-1999), American baseball player

See also
 Kurowie, a Polish knighthood family

References 

Polish-language surnames
Polish toponymic surnames